Congener may refer to:

 A thing or person of the same kind as another, or of the same group.
 Congener (biology), organisms within the same genus.
 Congener (chemistry), related chemicals, e.g., elements in the same group of the periodic table.
 Congener (beverages), a substance other than ethanol produced during the fermentation of alcoholic beverages.

Species
 Agabus congener, a beetle in the family Dytiscidae.
 Amata congener, a moth in the family Erebidae.
 Amyema congener, a flowering plant in the family Loranthaceae.
 Arthroplea congener, a mayfly in the family Arthropleidae.
 Elaphropus congener, a ground beetle in the family Carabidae.
 Gemmula congener, a sea snail in the family Turridae.
 Heterachthes congener, a beetle in the family Cerambycidae.
 Lestes congener, a damselfly in the family Lestidae.
 Megacyllene congener, a beetle in the family Cerambycidae.
 Potamarcha congener, a dragonfly in the family Libellulidae.

See also
 Congenic, in genetics
 PCB congener list

pt:Congênere